Brownsburg Community School Corporation (BCSC) is a public school district serving grades PK–12 in Brownsburg, Indiana.  The reported enrollment of the BCSC during the 2018–2019 school year was 9,296. The superintendent is Dr. Jim Snapp.

BCSC operates seven elementary schools, two middle schools, and one high school. In addition, Brownsburg has an Early Childhood Center (preschool), Harris Academy (an alternative high school offering specialized timelines for students) and ALPHA, a program for students with specific emotional problems.  During the 2017–2018 school year, Indiana's A-F school accountability rating for 9 schools was an A, the highest rating achievable. Lincoln Elementary was not included in the ratings, as it was not open for the 2017-2018 school year.

Schools 
The following schools are located within the district:

High schools 

 Brownsburg High School
 Harris Academy

Middle schools 

 Brownsburg East Middle School
 Brownsburg West Middle School

Elementary schools 

 Brown Elementary
 Cardinal Elementary
 Delaware Trail Elementary
 Eagle Elementary
 Lincoln Elementary
 Reagan Elementary
 White Lick Elementary

Preschools 

 Brownsburg Early Childhood Center

References

External links
 District Website

School districts in Indiana
Education in Hendricks County, Indiana